Melaleuca cucullata is a large shrub in the myrtle family, Myrtaceae and is endemic to the south-west of Western Australia. Its species name alludes to the shape of the leaves which resemble miniature academics' hoods.

Description 
Melaleuca cucullata is dense shrub with arching branches. Its leaves are sometimes arranged in alternating pairs (decussate) or sometimes alternately along the stem.

This species flowers profusely with heads of flowers at the ends of branches which continue to grow after flowering. The stamens are pure white, arranged in bundles of five around the flower with 5 to 9 stamens per bundle. The main flowering season is spring and the fruit which follow are woody capsules forming a tight oval shape.

Taxonomy and naming
This species was first formally described in 1852 by the Russian botanist Nikolai Turczaninow in Bulletin de la Classe physico-mathématique de l'Académie impériale des sciences de Saint-Pétersbourg. The specific epithet (cucullata) is from the Latin cucullus meaning "hood", referring to the leaves which resemble little hoods.

Distribution and habitat
This melaleuca occurs between the Lake Grace, Stirling Range and Israelite Bay districts in the Coolgardie, Esperance Plains and Mallee biogeographic regions. It grows on clay soils and loam on hillsides and flats.

Conservation status
Melaleuca cucullata is listed as "not threatened" by the Government of Western Australia Department of Parks and Wildlife.

References

cucullata
Myrtales of Australia
Rosids of Western Australia
Plants described in 1852
Endemic flora of Western Australia
Taxa named by Nikolai Turczaninow